Meade Glacier is located in the Goat Rocks region in the U.S. state of Washington.

See also
List of glaciers in the United States

References

Glaciers of the Goat Rocks
Gifford Pinchot National Forest
Glaciers of Washington (state)